Yuding Zhenren (玉鼎真人) is a Taoist deity and character in the classic Chinese novel Fengshen Yanyi. He is one of the twelve golden immortals. His disciple is Yang Jian and he taught him fighting and magical skills including the 72 earthly transformations.

In some Daoist records, Yuding Zhenren was said to one of the twelve disciples of Yuanshi Tianzun, who is the co-founder of Branch Chan of Taoism. Yuding ranked the second of the Twelve Golden Xian (十二金仙) along with Yuanshi Tianzun's other eleven students. During the war between the Zhou and Shang armies, he fought alongside the Zhou army with the other Twelve Golden Xian, helping to overthrow the Shang Dynasty.

References

Chinese gods
Investiture of the Gods characters
Deities in Taoism